Pigeon Point is an enumeration district in English Harbour. 

It is notable for Pigeon Point Beach.

Demographics

References 

English Harbour